Iza Bieżuńska-Małowist (1 January 1917 – 27 July 1995) was a Polish historian of the Ancient Era, professor at the Historical Institute of the University of Warsaw. Her husband Marian Małowist (1909–1988) was also a historian.

Life
She was born into a Jewish family as the daughter of Eliasz and Dyna Bieżuński, who were both killed during World War Two, along with twenty-one close family members. In 1952 she took up the chair in Ancient History at the Historical Institute of the University of Warsaw, becoming the head of the ancient history department from 1969 to 1987. For many years she was a member of the editorial board of Przegląd Przegląd.

Her students included Benedetto Bravo, Hanna Geremek, Maria Jaczynowska, Jerzy Kolendo, Ryszard Kulesza, Włodzimierz Lengauer, Tadeusz Łoposzko, Adam Łukaszewicz, Jan Trynkowski, Ewa Wipszycka-Bravo, Małgorzata Wojciechowska and Edward Zwolski. She died in Nieborów and was buried in the Jewish Cemetery, Warsaw (quarter 2, row 1).

Works
 1939: Położenie prawne kobiety greckiej w świetle źródeł papyrusowych
 1948: Źródła dopływu niewolników w okresie hellenistycznym
 1949: Dzieje ustroju rzymskiego w ujęciu Zdzisława Zmigrydera-Konopki
 1949: Z zagadnień niewolnictwa w okresie hellenistycznym
 1952: Poglądy nobilitas okresu Nerona i ich podłoże gospodarczo-społeczne
 1957: Sytuacja wewnętrzna Aten w dobie wojny peloponeskiej
 1958: Dzieje starożytnej Grecji
 1958: Poglądy Cicerona na zadania i obowiązki męża stanu
 1967: Ruch abolicjonistyczny a problem niewolnictwa starożytnego w historiografii XIX w.
 1968: Główne kierunki badań nad niewolnictwem starożytnym we współczesnej historiografii
 1987: Niewolnictwo
 1991: W kręgu wielkich humanistów. Kultura antyczna na Uniwersytecie Warszawskim po I wojnie światowej.
 1993: Kobiety Antyku

References

External links
http://nauka-polska.pl/#/profile/scientist?id=61848
https://encyklopedia.pwn.pl/haslo/;3877574

1917 births
1995 deaths
Jewish historians
20th-century Polish historians
Historians of antiquity
20th-century Polish women writers
Polish women historians